Hpala (also, Hpāla) is a village in Chipwi Township, Kachin State, Myanmar.

References

Villages in Myanmar